Francesco Clemente Giuseppe Sparanero (born 23 November 1941), known professionally as Franco Nero, is an Italian actor, producer, and director. His breakthrough role was as the title character in the Spaghetti Western film Django (1966), which made him a pop culture icon and launched an international career that includes over 200 leading and supporting roles in a wide variety of films and television programmes.

During the 1960s and 1970s, Nero was actively involved in many popular Italian "genre trends", including poliziotteschi, gialli, and Spaghetti Westerns. His best-known films include The Bible: In the Beginning... (1966), Camelot (1967), The Day of the Owl (1968), The Mercenary (1968), Battle of Neretva (1969), Tristana (1970), Compañeros (1970), Confessions of a Police Captain (1971), The Fifth Cord (1971), High Crime (1973), Street Law (1974), Keoma (1976), Hitch-Hike (1977), Force 10 from Navarone (1978), Enter the Ninja (1981), Die Hard 2 (1990), Letters to Juliet (2010), Cars 2 (2011), and John Wick: Chapter 2 (2017). 

Nero has had a long relationship with Vanessa Redgrave, which began during the filming of Camelot. They were married in 2006, and are the parents of the actor Carlo Gabriel Nero.

Early life
Francesco Clemente Giuseppe Sparanero was born in San Prospero Parmense (Parma, Emilia-Romagna), the son of a commissioned officer in the Carabinieri. His parents were originally from San Severo (Foggia, Apulia). He grew up in Bedonia and in Milan. He studied briefly at the Economy and Trade faculty of the local university, before leaving to study at the Piccolo Teatro di Milano.

Acting career

Nero's first film role was a small part in Pelle viva (1962), and he had his first lead role in Sergio Corbucci's Django (1966) a Spaghetti Western and one of his best-known films. In 1966 from Django he went on to appear in eight more films released that year including Texas, Adios (1966) and Massacre Time.

In 1967, he appeared in Camelot as Lancelot, where he met his longtime romantic partner, and later his wife, Vanessa Redgrave. Following this he appeared in the mafia film Il giorno della civetta opposite Claudia Cardinale released in 1968.

A lack of proficiency in English tended to limit these roles, although he also appeared in other English-language films including The Virgin and the Gypsy (1970), Force 10 from Navarone (1978), Enter the Ninja (1981) and Die Hard 2 (1990).

Although often typecast in films like Los amigos (1973) or Keoma (1976) he has attempted an impressive range of characters, such as Abel in John Huston's epic The Bible: In The Beginning (1966), the humiliated engineer out for revenge in Street Law, the gay lieutenant in Querelle (1982) and Serbian mediaeval hero in The Falcon (1983). He has appeared in over 150 films, and has written, produced and starred in one: Jonathan degli orsi (1993).

More recently, he starred in Hungarian director 's Honfoglalás (Conquest) in 1996, in Li chiamarono... briganti! (1999) by Pasquale Squitieri and subsequently in Koltay's Sacra Corona (Holy Crown) in 2001.

In 2009 he played an eccentric author called "Mario Puzzo" in Mord ist mein Geschäft, Liebling ("Murder is my trade, darling", Italian title "Tesoro, sono un killer"). German critics found his performance was the best part of the film: "Having Franco Nero playing in this film is really a great joy – it is only regrettable that after his appearances there is still so much film left."

In 2010, Nero appeared in the film Letters to Juliet with Redgrave. In 2011 he appeared as a guest star on the season 13 premiere episode of Law and Order: SVU. His character, although Italian, was based on Dominique Strauss-Kahn. In the same year, he received a star on the Italian Walk of Fame in Toronto, Ontario, Canada.

In 2012, Nero made a cameo appearance in the film Django Unchained in one scene alongside Jamie Foxx, who stars as Django Freeman in the film. Nero, playing the original Django, questions Foxx's Django about how his name is spelled, and asks him to spell it, referencing a scene from Nero's role as Django in the original Django film. Upon learning that their names are spelled the same way, Nero's Django says "I know" to Foxx's Django.

In 2016 and 2017 he interpreted Gabriele Tinti's poetry, giving voice to the masterpieces in the National Roman Museum.

Nero appears in the dark comedy feature film The Immortalist in 2020, along with Sherilyn Fenn, Paul Rodriguez, Aries Spears and Jeff DuJardin, directed by Vlad Kozlov.

Personal life
His romantic involvement with English actress Vanessa Redgrave began in 1966 when they met on the set of Camelot. In 1969, they had a son, Carlo Gabriel Redgrave Sparanero (known professionally as Carlo Gabriel Nero), a screenwriter and director. After separating for many years, during which they both had relationships with other people, they reunited and married on 31 December 2006. Carlo Nero directed Redgrave in the cinematic adaptation of Wallace Shawn's play The Fever.

Nero dated actresses Catherine Deneuve, Goldie Hawn, and Ursula Andress in the 1970s.

In 1983 he had a second son, Frank Sparanero (also known as Frankie Nero or Frank Nero Jr). Born in Rome, Nero began his acting career with Pupi Avati in 1996 at a film festival and then 1999 with the film Buck and the Magic Bracelet by Tonino Ricci. In addition to being an actor, he is also  an artist, architect and photographer. 

In December 1987, a paternity suit in a Court was filed against him in Colombia South America. where he was at that time doing a movie, after a brief romantic affair with Mauricia Mena, who claimed that he was the father of her little son Franquito.

In 1994, Nero walked his future stepdaughter Natasha Richardson (1963–2009) down the aisle when she married actor Liam Neeson. Her father, Tony Richardson, had died in 1991.

Filmography

Film

Television

Video games

Discography
1985 – Will Change The World/Cambierà (Lovers, LVNP 802, 7" – with his son Carlo)

References

External links

 
 

1941 births
Living people
David di Donatello winners
Italian expatriates in the United Kingdom
Italian male film actors
Male Spaghetti Western actors
Male Western (genre) film actors
People from the Province of Modena
People of Apulian descent
Redgrave family